Odorigui (踊り食い, literally "dancing eating") is a mode of seafood consumption in Japanese cuisine.

Odorigui refers to the consumption of live seafood while it is still moving, or the consumption of moving animal parts.  Animals usually consumed in odorigui style include octopus, squids, ice gobies, and other similar animals. Consumption of live seafood without remarkable movements, such as sea urchins, is usually not included in odorigui.

Notable dishes 
 Katsu ika odori-don (活いか踊り丼) lit. "living squid dancing rice bowl". In this dish, a mostly-complete squid is used, and its muscles twitch and move vigorously when soy sauce is poured over the rice.

See also 

 Ikizukuri, the preparation of sashimi from living animals
 Odori ebi, shrimp eaten alive in Japanese cuisine
 Drunken shrimp, shrimp sometimes eaten alive in Chinese cuisine
 Sannakji, octopus eaten alive in Korean cuisine
 Yin Yang fish
 Dojo nabe

References 

 大辞林 第三版 from 
 踊り食い in Japanese Wikipedia

External links 
  活きイカ踊り丼を食べる女子アナハプニング

Japanese cuisine
Fish dishes
Dishes involving the consumption of live animals